The Omsk State Medical University (OSMU) is a school of medicine in Omsk, Russia.

History 
It was founded as the Medical Faculty of the Siberian Institute of Veterinary Medicine and Zoology in 1920, and   reorganized as the West Siberian State Medical Institute in 1921.

It was renamed the Omsk State Medical Institute in 1925, and the Omsk State Medical Academy in 1994.

In 2015, the Academy was assigned with the status of University.

Organisation and administration 
There are more than 40,000 OSMU graduates in Russia and abroad, and there are more than 5,500 students studying in five faculties: medicine, pediatrics, preventive medicine, stomatology and pharmaceutics. 
The medical faculty (the school's oldest) was founded in 1920. The maternity and child-protection faculty was established in 1931, and reorganized into the pediatric faculty in 1934. The sanitary and hygienic faculty was founded in 1938, and renamed the preventive-medicine faculty in 1989. The dentistry faculty was established in 1957, and the pharmaceutical faculty was founded in 2002. Since 1997 OSMU has been headed by Alexander I. Novikov, MD, PhD, Professor and Academician of the International Academy of Advanced Sciences.

OSMU staff include members of the Honored Scientific Workers of the Russian Federation, Honored Staff Workers of the Higher School of the Russian Federation, Honored Physicians of the Russian Federation, and honorary professors.

OSMU has relationships with educational institutions in Western Europe, the United States, Japan and other countries. The school consists of 59 departments. Of its staff, 73 percent have an academic degree and over 100 MD-PhD full professors and 300 MD-PhD associate professors are employed by the academy.

The campus includes six buildings, with three dormitories providing accommodation for out-of-town students. The educational process uses up-to-date information technology. The academy has an electronic educational network integrated with the internet, featuring 350 computer terminals and 12 computer classes.

The Student Scientific Society, with about 800 members, provides the basis for physician training.

References

External links 
 

Omsk
Medical schools in Russia
Universities in Omsk Oblast